Robert Kurež (born 20 July 1991) is a Slovenian footballer who plays for Videm pri Ptuju as a forward.

References

External links
Player profile at NZS 
Robert Kurež at ÖFB 

1991 births
Living people
People from Ptuj
Slovenian footballers
Slovenia youth international footballers
Association football forwards
NK Drava Ptuj players
NK Aluminij players
Ergotelis F.C. players
NŠ Mura players
Slovenian PrvaLiga players
Slovenian Second League players
Super League Greece players
Slovenian expatriate footballers
Slovenian expatriate sportspeople in Greece
Expatriate footballers in Greece
Slovenian expatriate sportspeople in Austria
Expatriate footballers in Austria